Emam Kandi or Emamkandi may refer to various places in Iran:
 Emam Kandi, Khoy, West Azerbaijan Province
 Emam Kandi, Anzal, Urmia County, West Azerbaijan Province
 Emam Kandi, Sumay-ye Beradust, Urmia County, West Azerbaijan Province
 Emam Kandi, Torkaman, Urmia County, West Azerbaijan Province
 Emam Kandi, Khodabandeh, Zanjan Province
 Emam Kandi, Mahneshan, Zanjan Province